China Railway Signal & Communication (CRSC) is a Chinese company specializing in train control systems, such as signals. The company was established by a merger of several (state-owned) enterprises in 2010 and went public in 2015. The roots of the company date back to 1953.

The company is the developer of the Chinese Train Control System.

Subsidiaries
 CRSC Vehicle Corp (通号轨道车辆有限公司), a manufacturer of low floor trams, based in Changsha. It is a joint venture of CRSC and Inekon Trams of Czech Republic

 CASCO Signal Ltd (卡斯柯信号有限公司), signal solution provider headquartered in Shanghai. Is a joint venture of CRSC and Alstom

Controversy
CRSC is the maker of the signaling equipment used on the track of the Wenzhou train collision, and was held partially responsible for the disaster.

References

2010 establishments in China
Railway companies of China